Growth arrest-specific protein 7 is a protein that in humans is encoded by the GAS7 gene.

Growth arrest-specific 7 is expressed primarily in terminally differentiated brain cells and predominantly in mature cerebellar Purkinje neurons. GAS7 plays a putative role in neuronal development. Several transcript variants encoding proteins which vary in the N-terminus have been described.

References

Further reading